Late Night Tales: Sly & Robbie is a DJ mix album, mixed by Sly & Robbie, released as part of the Late Night Tales / Another Late Night series.

The album contains a hidden track located before the first song, accessed on CD players by skipping backwards from the beginning of the first track. It is a four-minute instrumental cover version of Madonna's song "La Isla Bonita" as performed by Sly & Robbie.

Track listing
"I L.O.V.E You 2002" - DJ DSL
"Coming Up For Air" - George Katsiris
"Woman To Woman" - Shirley Brown
"Quiet Storm" - Mobb Deep
"Toby" - The Chi-Lites
"Nights Over Egypt" - The Jones Girls
"Love Is The Message" - MFSB
"I'm In Love" - Evelyn "Champagne" King
"Manilla" (Headman version)  - Seelenluft
"Reasons to be Cheerful, Part 3" - Ian Dury and the Blockheads
"I Just Wanna Celebrate" - Rare Earth
"Patches" - Clarence Carter
"Who Write The Songs" - Jeymes Samuel & Canibus
"Superfly" - Curtis Mayfield
"Brand New" (Let's Stay Together) - Al Green
"A Rose Is Still A Rose" - Aretha Franklin
"The Tracks of My Tears" - Smokey Robinson
"The White City Part 2" - read by Brian Blessed

References

Sly and Robbie
2003 compilation albums
Sly and Robbie albums
Albums produced by Sly and Robbie